The British diaspora consists of people of British ancestry (and their descendants) who emigrated from the United Kingdom. For the purposes of this article, the people of British Overseas Territories are not included as British people though the territories are parts of the sovereign territory of the British state, unless they were born in that part of the British Isles that is currently within the British Realm, and only those who self-reported British ancestry are included in the figures for the British diaspora, which in colonies such as Bermuda – where very few of the Bermudians amongst the 63,779 inhabitants lack ancestry from the British Isles – likely results in substantial inaccuracies. This is a subject complicated by the recent history of the treatment of the people of colour, especially, of the British Overseas Territories by the British Government. The largest proportional concentrations of people of self-identified British descent in the world outside of the United Kingdom and its Overseas Territories occur in New Zealand (59%), Australia (45%), Canada (30.6%), the United States (11%), South Africa (2.6%) and parts of the Caribbean. Those who do claim British ancestry form a sub-set of those who could claim British ancestry; the British diaspora includes about 200 million people worldwide.

Additionally, countries with over 100,000 British expatriates include the Republic of Ireland, Spain, France, Germany, and the United Arab Emirates.

History of British diaspora

Up to the 19th century 

After the Age of Discovery, the various peoples of the British Isles, and especially the English, were among the earliest and by far the largest communities to emigrate out of Europe. Indeed, the British Empire's expansion during the first half of the 19th century saw an extraordinary dispersion of the British people, with particular concentrations in Australasia and North America.

The British Empire was "built on waves of migration overseas by British people", who left Great Britain, later the United Kingdom, and reached across the globe and permanently affected population structures in three continents. As a result of the British colonisation of the Americas, what became the United States was "easily the greatest single destination of emigrant British", but in what would become the Commonwealth of Australia the British experienced a birth rate higher than anything seen before, which together with continuing British immigration resulted in a huge outnumbering of indigenous Australians.

In colonies such as Southern Rhodesia, British Hong Kong, Singapore, Jamaica, Barbados, British East Africa, and the Cape Colony, permanently resident British communities were established, and while never more than a numerical minority, these Britons exercised a dominant influence upon the culture and politics of those lands. In Australia, Canada, and New Zealand, people of British origin came to constitute the majority of the population, contributing to these states becoming integral to the Anglosphere.

The British not only emigrated to parts of the British Empire, but also settled in large numbers in parts of the Americas, particularly in the United States and in sizeable numbers in Mexico, Chile and Argentina.

The United Kingdom census, 1861 estimated the number of overseas British to be around 2.5 million. However, it concluded that most of these were "not conventional settlers" but rather "travellers, merchants, professionals, and military personnel". By 1890, there were over 1.5 million further British-born people living in Australia, Canada, New Zealand, and South Africa.

British diaspora today 

According to The Foreign and Commonwealth Office, there were 13.1 million British nationals living abroad in 2004–05. These figures are taken from the consular annual returns from overseas posts. There is no requirement for UK citizens to register with British missions overseas, so these figures are therefore based on the most reliable information that can be obtained, e.g. from host government official statistics.

A 2006 publication from the Institute for Public Policy Research estimated that 5.5 million British-born people lived outside the United Kingdom.

In terms of outbound expatriation, in 2009, the United Kingdom had the most expatriates among developed OECD countries, with more than three million British living abroad, a figure followed by Germany and Italy. On an annual basis, emigration from Britain has stood at about 400,000 per year for the past 10 years.

Living abroad as an expatriate can affect certain rights. In particular:
 can only vote in general elections if they have been on a British electoral register at some point in the past 15 years.  Otherwise, they are not eligible to vote. This Briefing Paper provides information on the eligibility to vote in UK Parliamentary elections for British citizens living overseas and the government's plans to end the 15-year rule – it's 'votes for life' policy.
The British Mental Health Act 1983 rules that persons resident abroad do not qualify as "nearest relative" of a person who is ordinarily resident in the United Kingdom, the Channel Islands or the Isle of Man.

British people by country

List of countries and territories by population of self-reported British ancestry

Institute for Public Policy Research (IPPR) estimates

In 2006, the Institute for Public Policy Research (IPPR), a British think tank, published a report on the British diaspora, entitled Brits Abroad. The following table lists the estimated number of British people (defined as people who are British Subjects, such as British citizen, British National Overseas or British Overseas Citizen) living overseas in countries or territories (including British Overseas Territories) with more than 100 British people, according to the IPPR's report:

 Note: A different estimate puts China (incl. Hong Kong) ahead with a population of 3,750,000 British citizens, most of which are those in Hong Kong who have continued to possess British nationality, particularly the British nationals (overseas) status, which numbered 3.4 million, through their connection with the former crown colony (see British nationality and Hong Kong for further details).

See also

 Anglosphere
 British Empire
 CANZUK

References

Notes

Bibliography
 
 

 
British Empire
British culture
European diasporas